Basketball, for the 2019 Island Games, held at the Tercentenary Hall, Gibraltar in July 2019.

Medal table

Results

References

2019 Island Games
Basketball at the Island Games
Island Games